Alfred Eddison Hutton (31 December 1865 – 30 May 1947) was a British Liberal politician and manufacturer.

Background
Hutton was born and lived much of his life in Eccleshill, near Bradford on 31 December 1865 the son of James and Eliza Hutton, his father was a wool merchant. He was educated at Mill Hill School and Trinity College, Cambridge. He received a Bachelor of Arts in 1887 and a Master of Arts in 1891.

Politics
In 1892 he was elected as Liberal MP for Morley, in the West Riding of Yorkshire at the General Election. The seat had been Liberal since it was created in 1885 and remained so until it was abolished in 1918. In 1910 he retired from the House, not contesting the January General Election.

References

1865 births
1947 deaths
Liberal Party (UK) MPs for English constituencies
UK MPs 1892–1895
Politicians from Bradford
Place of birth missing